The 1966 United States House of Representatives elections in South Carolina were held on November 8, 1966 to select six Representatives for two-year terms from the state of South Carolina.  All six incumbents were re-elected and the composition of the state delegation remained five Democrats and one Republican.

1st congressional district
Incumbent Democratic Congressman L. Mendel Rivers of the 1st congressional district, in office since 1941, was unopposed in his bid for re-election.

General election results

|-
| 
| colspan=5 |Democratic hold
|-

2nd congressional district
Incumbent Republican Congressman Albert Watson of the 2nd congressional district, in office since 1963, defeated Democratic challenger Fred LeClercq.

General election results

|-
| 
| colspan=5 |Republican hold
|-

3rd congressional district
Incumbent Democratic Congressman William Jennings Bryan Dorn of the 3rd congressional district, in office since 1951, defeated Republican challenger John Grisso.

General election results

|-
| 
| colspan=5 |Democratic hold
|-

4th congressional district
Incumbent Democratic Congressman Robert T. Ashmore of the 4th congressional district, in office since 1953, was unopposed in his bid for re-election.

General election results

|-
| 
| colspan=5 |Democratic hold
|-

5th congressional district
Incumbent Democratic Congressman Thomas S. Gettys of the 5th congressional district, in office since 1964, was unopposed in his bid for re-election.

General election results

|-
| 
| colspan=5 |Democratic hold
|-

6th congressional district
Incumbent Democratic Congressman John L. McMillan of the 6th congressional district, in office since 1939, defeated Republican challenger Archie C. Odom.

General election results

|-
| 
| colspan=5 |Democratic hold
|-

See also
United States House elections, 1966
United States Senate election in South Carolina, 1966
United States Senate special election in South Carolina, 1966
South Carolina gubernatorial election, 1966
South Carolina's congressional districts

References
"Supplemental Report of the Secretary of State to the General Assembly of South Carolina." Reports and Resolutions of South Carolina to the General Assembly of the State of South Carolina. Volume II. Columbia, SC: 1967, p. 17.

South Carolina
United States House of Representatives
1966